Rahmanabad may refer to various places in Iran:
 Rahmanabad, Hamadan
 Rahmanabad, Kermanshah
 Rahmanabad, Iranshahr, Sistan and Baluchestan Province
 Rahmanabad, Khash, Sistan and Baluchestan Province
 Rahmanabad, Irandegan, Khash County, Sistan and Baluchestan
 Rahmanabad, Qasr-e Qand, Sistan and Baluchestan Province
 Rahmanabad, Sarbaz, Sistan and Baluchestan Province
 Rahmanabad, West Azerbaijan